The 2022 Internazionali di Tennis Castel del Monte was a professional tennis tournament played on indoor hard courts. It was the seventh edition of the tournament which was part of the 2022 ATP Challenger Tour. It took place in Andria, Italy between 21 and 27 November 2022.

Singles main-draw entrants

Seeds

 1 Rankings are as of 14 November 2022.

Other entrants
The following players received wildcards into the singles main draw:
  Federico Arnaboldi
  Gianmarco Ferrari
  Stefano Travaglia

The following players received entry from the qualifying draw:
  Mathys Erhard
  Arthur Fils
  Alibek Kachmazov
  Illya Marchenko
  Stuart Parker
  Andrew Paulson

The following players received entry as lucky losers:
  Evgeny Karlovskiy
  David Poljak

Champions

Singles

 Leandro Riedi def.  Mikhail Kukushkin 7–6(7–4), 6–3.

Doubles

 Julian Cash /  Henry Patten def.  Francesco Forti /  Marcello Serafini 6–7(3–7), 6–4, [10–4].

References

2022 ATP Challenger Tour
2022
2022 in Italian tennis
November 2022 sports events in Italy